Evelyn O'Rourke is an Irish broadcaster employed by RTÉ

O'Rourke joined RTÉ in 1998 as a researcher on The Gay Byrne Show and The Arts Show on RTÉ Radio 1 before moving on to become roving reporter on Today with Pat Kenny on RTÉ Radio 1 and The Gerry Ryan Show on RTÉ 2fm. She has served as a presenter on several RTÉ programmes, including Drivetime Liveline and Morning Ireland on RTÉ Radio 1 as well as an annual Countdown to the Leaving Cert series on RTÉ 2fm on which she offered advice to Leaving Certificate students. She also was a regular contributor to the "It Says in the Papers" slot on Morning Ireland. Other television work includes Crimecall, The Daily Show, Seoige and as a judge on TV talent shows Glas Vegas and The All Ireland Talent Show.

Early life and education 
O'Rourke was born in Dublin. She attended Coláiste Iosagáin on Dublin's Southside. Having completed her school studies she attended Trinity College Dublin to study Drama and English from 1990 – 1994. After this she moved to the West of Ireland to work in film and television. In 1998 O'Rourke returned to Dublin, joining RTÉ Radio, working with the veteran broadcaster Gay Byrne during his final season on radio. She was then transferred to The Arts Show with Mike Murphy, and later to Today with Pat Kenny where she was employed as a reporter. She then worked in radio as Ryan Tubridy's first "newspaper lady" on the now-defunct RTÉ 2fm breakfast show The Full Irish. In September 2002, she began reporting for The Gerry Ryan Show.

Career

Radio
O'Rourke began working for RTÉ in 1998 as a researcher on The Gay Byrne Show. Her next job was on The Arts Show and she then joined Today with Pat Kenny as a reporter. She was then promoted to the position of The Gerry Ryan Shows roving reporter on RTÉ 2fm.

Presenting roles

She has presented many programmes on radio and TV including 'Liveline', 'Today with Pat Kenny', 'The Gerry Ryan Show' and she presented a tribute show to Gerry Ryan the day after his death in 2010, her first show since having a baby. Head of 2FM John McMahon, hugged his tearful wife Evelyn O’Rourke, a Gerry Ryan Show reporter for eight years, after she signed the condolence book. She presented a special tribute to Ryan on Saturday morning, in her first radio show since returning from maternity leave. The couple regarded Ryan as a friend as well as a colleague. "Both Gerry and John are gadget freaks," said O’Rourke. "We keep saying ‘are’, we keep talking about him in the present tense," her husband responded.

Operation Transformation

O'Rourke took on the role of radio reporter and television presenter for the RTÉ cross-media event Operation Transformation in 2008. She performed the role of "cheerleader" to her companion Gerry Ryan's "ringmaster". She was also helpful in the choosing of the 2010 participants despite her first pregnancy and childbirth occurring around this time.<

Television work
Amongst her other television appearances are Seoige, The Cafe and The Lucy Kennedy Show.

O'Rourke appeared on The Panel on 29 January 2009.

O'Rourke was a judge on the 10 January edition of series two of The All Ireland Talent Show after Shane Lynch's flight from London was cancelled, despite having given birth to her first son just six weeks earlier. She also served as an advisor to Shane Lynch on The All Ireland Talent Show'. She was also a judge on TG4 variety show Glas Vegas Personal life 
O'Rourke is married to John McMahon (born 10 December) and they have two sons, Oisin and Ross. O'Rourke holidays in West Kerry each year with her family and friends.

On 2 December 2009 she gave birth to her first son, Oisin Brian McMahon. Her second son, Ross Pascal, was born on 2 February 2011.
She returned to RTÉ in November 2011 where she joined the Radio 1 Arts and Culture programme 'Arena' as a reporter. Since her return she has also appeared on a number of programmes ranging from 'Crime Call' as stand in presenter, 'The Today programme' as contributor on RTÉ television, and 'The Colm Hayes Show' on 2fm. She is now the reporter on the popular RTÉ Radio 1 arts and popular culture programme Arena.

External links
 Podcasts of Countdown to 606''

Year of birth missing (living people)
Living people
Irish radio presenters
Irish women radio presenters
Irish women television presenters
Irish reporters and correspondents
People from County Dublin
RTÉ 2fm presenters
RTÉ television presenters
The Gerry Ryan Show